Jeff Mills is an American football coach. He is the senior quality control for defense at Iowa State University, a position he has held since 2021. Mills served as the head football coach at New Mexico Highlands University in Las Vegas, New Mexico from 2015 to 2016, compiling a record of 2–20. He was as the defensive coordinator and safeties coach at Houston Baptist University—now known as Houston Christian University—from 2018 to 2020.

Mills is the brother of former Charleston Southern Buccaneers football coach Jay Mills.

Head coaching record

References

External links
 Iowa State profile
 Houston Baptist profile
 New Mexico Highlands profile

Year of birth missing (living people)
Living people
American football outside linebackers
American football quarterbacks
Drake Bulldogs football coaches
Houston Christian Huskies football coaches
Iowa State Cyclones football coaches
Idaho Vandals football coaches
Indiana State Sycamores coaches
Montana State Bobcats football coaches
Nevada Wolf Pack football coaches
New Mexico Highlands Cowboys football coaches
New Mexico Lobos football coaches
Washington Huskies football coaches
Western Washington Vikings football coaches
Western Washington Vikings football players
Youngstown State Penguins football coaches
People from Urbandale, Iowa
Coaches of American football from Iowa
Players of American football from Iowa